Gaby Rodgers (née Gabrielle Rosenberg; born March 29, 1928 in Frankfurt-am-Main, Germany) is a German-born American actress, theater director, and journalist.

Biography
Rodgers is the daughter of Jewish art dealer Saemy Rosenberg, the niece of art historian Jakob Rosenberg and the great-niece of the philosopher Edmund Husserl. Rodgers was born in Germany but emigrated with her family to Amsterdam, London and finally into the United States as refugees from the National Socialist regime in Germany. In Amsterdam, she played marbles with Anne Frank as her family knew the Franks.

Although she worked extensively as a television actress in the 1950s, Rodgers is perhaps best remembered as Lily Carver in the 1955 film Kiss Me Deadly. Her only other film role was in the 1953 New York indie The Big Break. She appeared on the cover of the January 1957 issue of Cosmopolitan, representing "The New Face of Broadway".  Rodgers continued to work as a stage actress and director into the new century.

Private life
Rodgers was married for many years to lyricist Jerry Leiber, half of the songwriting team of Leiber & Stoller, who wrote "Hound Dog", "Jailhouse Rock", and other songs. Rodgers frequently is cited as co-author of the song "Jackson" with Billy Edd Wheeler, but this is untrue; Leiber wrote the song with Wheeler, using his then-wife's name as a pseudonym.

References

External links

Actresses from Amsterdam
American film actresses
American television actresses
German emigrants to the United States
Living people
21st-century American women
1928 births